Rufus Wainwright: Live from the Artists Den is a live album by American-Canadian singer-songwriter Rufus Wainwright, released by Artists Den Records and Universal Music Enterprises on March 3, 2014. The album was recorded at a concert on May 17, 2012 at the Church of the Ascension in Greenwich Village, New York City, which was originally filmed for the PBS program Live from the Artists Den.

Live from the Artists Den features sixteen tracks, including five that did not air in the broadcast. Ten songs are from Out of the Game (2012), Wainwright's seventh studio album. The album also includes two songs from Want Two (2004) and one song each from Want One (2003) and Release the Stars (2007). Also featured are songs written by Wainwright's parents: "One Man Guy" (Loudon Wainwright III) originally appeared on I'm Alright (1985) and was recorded for Wainwright's second studio album, Poses (2001); "On My Way to Town" (Kate McGarrigle) is from Kate & Anna McGarrigle's album Love Over and Over (1982). Mark Ronson, who produced Out of the Game, is featured on guitar on "Bitter Tears".

Details of the album emerged in January 2014. The recording was released in CD, digital and Blu-ray Disc formats, the latter of which will contain 50 minutes of bonus footage.

Composition

Rufus Wainwright: Live from the Artists Den was recorded on May 17, 2012 at a private concert at the Church of the Ascension in Greenwich Village, New York City. The concert was filmed and recorded for the PBS program Live from the Artists Den. Constructed in 1841, the Church of the Ascension is a National Historic Landmark, located at the intersection of Fifth Avenue and Tenth Street. Wainwright said of performing in the church: "I've found that the venue essentially dictates everything. For someone who is pretty focused on the capabilities of the voice, as I am, churches are our friends." The album features sixteen tracks, including five songs that did not air in the broadcast.

An a cappella rendition of "Candles", the closing track from Wainwright's Out of the Game (2012), serves as the album's opener. Other songs from Out of the Game include "Rashida", "Song of You", "Barbara", "Welcome to the Ball", "Respectable Dive", "Jericho", the title track ("Out of the Game"), "Montauk" and "Bitter Tears". "The One You Love" and "The Art Teacher" appeared on Wainwright's fourth studio album, Want Two (2004). "One Man Guy", written by Wainwright's father Loudon Wainwright III, originally appeared on I'm Alright (1985) and was recorded for Wainwright's second studio album, Poses (2001). "Going to a Town" and "14th Street" originally appeared on Wainwright's fifth and third studio albums, Release the Stars (2007) and Want One (2003), respectively. "On My Way to Town", written by Wainwright's mother Kate McGarrigle, originally appeared on Kate & Anna McGarrigle's album Love Over and Over (1982). Wainwright's emotional, solo piano performance of the song paid tribute to his mother, who died of clear-cell sarcoma in January 2010. For the "disco-flavored" rendition of "Bitter Tears", Wainwright was accompanied by Mark Ronson, who produced Out of the Game, on guitar.

The album was released in CD, digital and Blu-ray Disc formats, the latter featuring 50 minutes of "behind-the-scenes" bonus content, including interviews with Wainwright and Father Andrew (the church's since-retired rector), shoot and location footage, and a slideshow called "Night in Pictures".

Promotion
Details of the album were released in January 2014. In a press release issued by Universal, Mark Lieberman, creator and executive producer of Live from the Artists Den, said of Wainwright's performance: "Rufus Wainwright is amongst the finest performers of our time. His 'Artists Den' secret show at the Church of the Ascension is still one of my favorite nights, a rare moment in the illustrious career of this incredible musician."

Reception

Track listing

Track listing adapted from the Fort Mill Times.

Personnel

 Rufus Wainwright – vocals, guitar, piano
 Teddy Thompson – vocals, guitar
 Krystle Warren and Charysse Blackman – vocals
 Sharief Hobley – guitar
 Tim Ries – horns
 Andy Burton – keyboard
 Brad Albetta – bass
 Ben Perowsky – drums
 Mark Ronson – guitar (track 16)

Release history

References

External links
 Rufus Wainwright at theartistsden.com
 Rufus Wainwright Blu-Ray and Live Album Press Kit at theartistsden.com
 
 
 
 
 

2014 live albums
2014 video albums
Live pop rock albums
Pop rock video albums
Rufus Wainwright albums
Universal Music Enterprises live albums
Universal Music Enterprises video albums